Saddlebrooke is a census-designated place (CDP) and retirement community in Pinal County, Arizona, United States. The population was 12,574 at the United States 2020 Census

There are two communities managed by homeowner associations within the retirement development; SaddleBrooke One, and SaddleBrooke Two, the latter includes the Preserve subdivision. Eagle Crest is a smaller all age subdivision that is part of the SaddleBrooke (CDP).  

SaddleBrooke, Arizona is located just north of Oro Valley, AZ. and close to Tucson AZ . The 3400 ft elevation in the foothills results in cooler year round temperatures compared to many other Arizona locations. In the foothills of the Catalina Mountains. It has rolling and changing in topography and elevation changes

Demographics

In 2010 the racial and ethnic makeup of Saddlebrooke's population was 92.8% non-Hispanic white, 0.8% black or African American, 0.2% Native American, 0.9% Asian, 0.9% two or more races and 4.9% Hispanic or Latino.

Gallery

Notes

Census-designated places in Pinal County, Arizona

External Links

Saddlebrooke Community Visitor and Resident Guide
Retirement communities
Unincorporated communities in Pinal County, Arizona
Unincorporated communities in Arizona